Endang Nursugianti (born 29 November 1983) is an Indonesian badminton player and coach.

Career 
Nursigianti started her badminton career when she was young. In 2001, she competed at the Asian Junior Championships, winning a silver in the girls' doubles and two bronzes in the mixed doubles and girls' team event.

In 2005, she won the bronze medal at the Asian Championships in the mixed doubles event partnered with Muhammad Rijal. Nursugianti won the women's doubles at the 2006 Dutch Open with Rani Mundiasti. She was a member of the Indonesian team that won a women's team gold at the 2007 Southeast Asian Games, and silver medals at the 2007 Sudirman Cup and 2008 Uber Cup.

Personal life 
When she was young, she joined the Jaya Raya Jakarta badminton club. Her parents' names are Tasurun (father) and Sugiarti (mother). Her hobbies are swimming and reading books. Generally people called her Endang. After coaching stints at PB Djarum Badminton club Endang currently is coach of the Papuan & Bali Badminton team.  She also performed badminton clinics for the  Indonesian Badminton Association (PBSI) as a Women's Doubles Coach.

Achievements

Asian Championships 
Mixed doubles

Asian Junior Championships 
Girls' doubles

Mixed doubles

IBF World Grand Prix 
The World Badminton Grand Prix was sanctioned by the International Badminton Federation from 1983 to 2006.

Women's doubles

Mixed doubles

BWF International Challenge/Series/Asian Satellite 
Women's doubles

Mixed doubles

References

External links 
 

1983 births
Living people
Sportspeople from Jakarta
Indonesian female badminton players
Competitors at the 2007 Southeast Asian Games
Southeast Asian Games gold medalists for Indonesia
Southeast Asian Games medalists in badminton
21st-century Indonesian women
20th-century Indonesian women